Lovegod is the second studio album by the Soup Dragons, released in 1990. Four songs from the album were released as singles—"Backwards Dog", "Crotch Deep Trash", "Mother Universe" and "I'm Free". The latter, a cover of a Rolling Stones cut from their 1965 album Out of Our Heads, made the top 5 in the UK charts. First pressings did not include "I'm Free", but it was subsequently placed first on the re-release, which also dates to 1990.

The album peaked at No. 7 on the UK Albums Chart. It peaked at No. 88 on the Billboard 200. The video for "I'm Free" made it to the top spot on MTV's most requested list.

Critical reception
Trouser Press called the album "an effective, accessible (if ultimately tedious) trip of house-geared rhythms, semi-firm melodies and singer/guitarist/programmer Sean Dickson’s obviously mind-expanded lyrics." Spin deemed it "well-crafted danceable rock with immaculate production."

Track listing
All songs by Sean Dickson except where noted.
 "I'm Free" (featuring Junior Reid) (Mick Jagger, Keith Richards) – 3:58
 "Mother Universe" – 3:43
 "Backwards Dog" – 2:17
 "Softly" – 2:55
 "Drive the Pain" – 2:20
 "Lovegod" – 3:38
 "Dream-E-Forever" – 2:14
 "Sweetmeat" – 4:22
 "Kiss the Gun" – 2:31
 "Love You to Death" – 2:40
 "Beauty Freak" – 3:07
 "Lovegod Dub" – 4:14
 "Crotch Deep Trash" – 2:56

Personnel
The Soup Dragons
 Sean Dickson – vocals, guitar
 Jim McCullough – backing vocals, guitar
 Sushil K. Dade – bass guitar
 Paul Quinn – drums, percussion

Charts

References

1990 albums
The Soup Dragons albums